Amanda Higgs is an Australian producer, writer and executive best known for her work in TV.

She co-created The Secret Life of Us and produced the first three series. She was a drama executive at ABC.

Select filmography
Water Rats (1998–99) - script editor
The Secret Life of Us (2001–03) - co-creator, producer
Bed of Roses (2008–10) - executive producer
The Time of Our Lives (2013–14) - producer

References

External links

Living people
Year of birth missing (living people)
Australian writers
Australian women writers
Australian television producers
Australian women television producers